Those Three French Girls  is a 1930 American Pre-Code comedy film directed by Harry Beaumont and starring Fifi D'Orsay, Reginald Denny, and Cliff Edwards. The dialogue was written by P. G. Wodehouse.

Premise
While on holiday in a small French town, an Englishman (Denny) encounters three French girls (D'Orsay, d'Avril, and Ravel) and two American men (Edwards and Brophy).

Cast
 Fifi D'Orsay as Charmaine
 Reginald Denny as Larry Winthrop
 Cliff Edwards as  Owly Owen
 Yola d'Avril as Diane
 Sandra Ravel as Madelon
 George Grossmith, Jr. as Earl of Ippleton
 Edward Brophy as Yank Dugan
 Peter Gawthorne as Parker - the Butler

References

External links

1930 films
1930 comedy films
1930s English-language films
Films directed by Harry Beaumont
Metro-Goldwyn-Mayer films
American comedy films
American black-and-white films
Films set in France
1930s American films